Laffer may refer to:
 Laffer, South Australia, locality
 Arthur Laffer (born 1940), American economist
 George Laffer (1866–1933), South Australian politician
 Jae Laffer, Australian rock singer-songwriter
 Larry Laffer, a fictional character from the Leisure Suit Larry game series

See also

Lafer, surname
Laugher (disambiguation)